Tridynamia is a genus of flowering plants belonging to the family Convolvulaceae.

Its native range is Assam to China and Malaysian Peninsula.

Species:
 Tridynamia bialata (Kerr) Staples 
 Tridynamia megalantha (Merr.) Staples 
 Tridynamia sinensis (Hemsl.) Staples 
 Tridynamia spectabilis (Kurz) Parmar

References

Convolvulaceae
Convolvulaceae genera